Parorchestia tenuis is a species of amphipod in the family Talitridae. It is "widespread and common" in New Zealand, and is only missing from Canterbury and North Otago.

References

Gammaridea
Freshwater crustaceans of New Zealand
Crustaceans described in 1852